The Brentford by-election was a Parliamentary by-election held on 23 March 1911. It returned one Member of Parliament (MP)  to the House of Commons of the Parliament of the United Kingdom, elected by the first past the post voting system.

The incumbent Conservative Member of Parliament, Lord Alwyne Compton, resigned for private and business reasons.

Previous result

Candidates

Result

References

 Craig, F. W. S. (1974). British parliamentary election results 1885–1918 (1 ed.). London: Macmillan. 
 Who's Who: www.ukwhoswho.com
 Debrett's House of Commons 1916

Brentford by-election
Brentford by-election
Brentford by-election
20th century in Middlesex
Brentford,1911
Brentford,1911
Unopposed by-elections to the Parliament of the United Kingdom (need citation)